José Rivera (born July 30, 1936) was a member of the New York State Assembly, representing the Fordham-Bedford, Kingsbridge Heights, Bedford Park, and Belmont sections of the Bronx. He is a Democrat.

Biography
Rivera was born in 1936 in San Juan, Puerto Rico. He was a member of the New York State Assembly from 1983 to 1987, sitting in the 185th, 186th and 187th New York State Legislatures. He was a member of the New York City Council from 1987 to 2000. Rivera was elected again to the State Assembly in 2000, and was the head of the Democratic Party in the Bronx from 2002 until he was ousted in 2008 by the so-called Rainbow Rebels.

Prior to his election to the Assembly in 1982, Rivera gained prominence as a labor advocate and organizer of construction workers and "gypsy" taxicab drivers.

During his tenure as County Leader of the Bronx, Rivera was frequently advised by Mike Nieves, a Democratic party consultant and strategist. Rivera was a vocal advocate for the withdrawal of the U.S. Navy from its bombing range on the island of Vieques, Puerto Rico, and was arrested in 2001, together with Al Sharpton and other political figures, for trespassing onto the Navy's Vieques facility. The Navy subsequently agreed to withdraw from the Vieques facility. Two of his children, Joel Rivera and Naomi Rivera, were formerly elected officials in the Bronx, and were members of the New York City Council and New York State Assembly, respectively.

In the 2022 primary, he lost his re-nomination bid to George Alvarez.

References

External links
Official New York State Assembly Website

|-

1936 births
American politicians of Puerto Rican descent
Living people
Democratic Party members of the New York State Assembly
New York City Council members
Hispanic and Latino American New York City Council members
Hispanic and Latino American state legislators in New York (state)
People from San Juan, Puerto Rico
21st-century American politicians
Politicians from the Bronx
Puerto Rican people in New York (state) politics